This is a partial discography of Capriccio, Richard Strauss's opera from 1942. Capriccio: A Conversation Piece for Music is his final opera.

Recordings

References

Opera discographies
Operas by Richard Strauss